Kirkintilloch Basin railway station, also known as Middlemuir Basin railway station served the town of Kirkintilloch, East Dunbartonshire, Scotland, from 1828 to 1846 on the Monkland and Kirkintilloch Railway.

History 
The station was opened on 7 July 1828 by the Monkland and Kirkintilloch Railway. It was a passenger station as well as a goods depot. It was served by brief intermittent services. The first service was horse-drawn, which ran on 8 July 1828. Services stopped shortly after. Services resumed in late 1839 but stopped again in 1840. They resumed again on 26 December 1844 but stopped in March 1846.

References 

Disused railway stations in East Dunbartonshire
Railway stations in Great Britain opened in 1828
Railway stations in Great Britain closed in 1846
1828 establishments in Scotland
1846 disestablishments in Scotland
Kirkintilloch